Robert Phelps (21 July 1890 – 28 March 1980) was a British wrestler. He competed in the lightweight event at the 1912 Summer Olympics.

References

1890 births
1980 deaths
Olympic wrestlers of Great Britain
Wrestlers at the 1912 Summer Olympics
British male sport wrestlers
Sportspeople from London